The first season of Psych originally aired in the United States on the USA Network television network between July 7, 2006 and March 2, 2007. Produced by Universal Cable Productions and Tagline Television, the series was created by Steve Franks, who served as executive producer with Kelly Kulchak and Chris Henze. 

The comedy-drama series focuses on Shawn Spencer (James Roday), a police consultant who pretends to be psychic, and his assistant Burton "Gus" Guster, a pharmaceuticals salesman. The season consisted of fifteen 43-minute episodes, which aired at 10:00 p.m. on Fridays. Franks conceived the idea for the show when producers at Columbia Pictures requested he pitch them ideas for a TV program while he was working on the film Big Daddy. Initially rejected, the concept was shelved for several years until Franks collaborated with Kulchak to create an hour-long TV show. USA Network picked up the program, initially ordering an eleven-episode season. 

Overall, the first season has received generally positive reviews from critics. Initially, the show was met with mixed reviews, with episodes later in the season receiving generally positive reception. Many critics compared the series to its lead-in program, Monk, leading to negative opinions on the program's originality. The premiere episode was watched by approximately 6.1 million viewers, making it the highest-rated scripted series premiere for a cable network. However, ratings decreased for the following episodes, with the next highest-rated episode achieving just 4.76 million viewers, according to the Nielsen ratings. The season finale, "Scary Sherry: Bianca's Toast", received the best reviews of the season and saw an increase in viewership.

Cast

Main Cast
 James Roday as Shawn Spencer
 Dulé Hill as Burton "Gus" Guster
 Timothy Omundson as Carlton Lassiter
 Anne Dudek as Lucinda Barry
 Corbin Bernsen as Henry Spencer
 Maggie Lawson as Juliet O'Hara

Recurring Cast
 Kirsten Nelson as interim police chief Karen Vick 
 Liam James, Josh Hayden, and Kyle Pejpar as Young Shawn Spencer
 Sage Brocklebank as police officer Buzz McNab
 Carlos McCullers II, Julien Hill, and Isaah Brown as Young Gus
 Patricia Idlette as Police Officer Allen

Episodes

Production

Conception and development
Steve Franks originally conceived the concept for Psych while working as the lead writer for the 1999 film Big Daddy. After he successfully pitched the film to producers with Columbia Pictures, Franks was requested to come up with ideas for five new TV programs. He presented the shows to Columbia, who rejected all proposals. Among the outlines he presented was the source for Psych. After the programs were rejected, he shelved the ideas. Franks would not reopen the idea for Psych until several years later, when he met with producer Kelly Kulchak about creating a one-hour long TV program. After discussion, Franks presented the idea for Psych, which Kulchak deemed to be "brilliant".

After finalizing an episode draft for Psych, Franks and Kulchak pitched the show to all major TV networks, including the Fox Broadcasting Company, NBC, ABC, and CBS. The show was rejected by each network they presented the idea to. Kulchak stated that "it was a great pitch and that everybody laughed, but no one wanted to buy it". She attributed its rejection to the show's unique comedy–drama format, which was virtually unused by a TV show at the time. They then pitched the show to several cable networks, where it was again rejected. The final network Franks and Kulchak pitched the show to was USA Network. The network "loved the concept", and decided to produce the show.

Franks has cited multiple sources as inspiration for the show. His father, as well as multiple uncles, are former Los Angeles Police Department officers; Franks has given real-life experiences as direct inspiration for numerous events which occurred in the first season. Franks later explained that his comedic inspiration for the program was that he always "thought it would be fun to apply my comic sensibility to a cop show". He has since explained that the inspiration for the fake-psychic concept in the show was due to a longtime wish to write a show about a man with "no psychic abilities but just had a great grasp of details". The program's unique comedy drama format has been explained by producers to have been inspired by several 1980s detective shows. A prominent source cited by executives and actors was the TV show Moonlighting. Other sources include programs Remington Steele and Simon & Simon.

USA Network first announced their potential broadcasting of Psych on June 17, 2005. The network stated that they had requested a pilot episode of the series, to be managed by Tagline Productions. The original working name for the series was "Psyche". It was announced on August 30 that the production for the show's pilot episode would begin shortly, and the episode would likely air in 2006. On January 5, 2006, USA announced the Psyche would be competing against In Plain Sight, written by David Maples, and Underfunded, written by David Breckman, for air time and broadcasting slots. Later in January, the network confirmed that the pilot episode for the show would air later that year. They also announced that the show's name had changed to Psych. On February 21, 2006, USA Network announced that it had ordered eleven one-hour episode scripts for Psych. They confirmed that the show would take Monk's Friday night time slot, and that the pilot episode, planned to be two hours in length, would be broadcast on July 7.

Broadcast

Psych's first season commenced broadcasting in the United States on July 7, 2006, and ended with the airing of "Scary Sherry: Bianca's Toast" on March 2, 2007. The season's first eight episodes aired during July and August 2006, while the remaining seven were broadcast from January through March of the next year. For the entire first season, Psych aired at a 10:00 P.M. ET/PT time slot on Fridays. Every episode in the season, save the premiere, ran for an hour, including commercials. Twelve of the season's fifteen episodes were 43 minutes in length, while "Speak Now or Forever Hold Your Piece" and "Woman Seeking Dead Husband: Smokers Okay, No Pets" ran for one minute less, and "Pilot" was a special extended episode. The episode "Pilot" ran for 66 minutes, in an hour-and-a-half time slot with commercials. The international version of the episode ran for an extended 90 minutes. USA Network's sister broadcast network NBC aired episodes from season 1 on August 7 and 14, 2016. 

The show's time slot had previously been occupied by the first season of USA Network's revival of Kojak, which lasted for ten episodes in mid-2005 before being cancelled. After Kojak's cancellation, the slot was replaced by hit series Monk. The show was entering its fifth season, and received very high ratings in the Friday timeslot. Hoping that Psych would share in Monk's successful ratings, USA Network executives moved the fifth season to a 9:00 P.M. slot on the same day, airing directly before Psych. The pairing was well-received, being called a "well-written comedy-mystery block that comprises some of the best two hours on television".

Crew
 
Tagline Productions and Universal Cable Productions produced the first season of Psych; series creator and showrunner Steve Franks was the executive producer, along with Kelly Kulchak and Tagline executive Chris Henze. Jack Sakmar, Kerry Lenhart, and Mel Damski were co-executive producers, while Paulo De Olviera and Wendy Belt Wallace produced, and Tracey Jeffery was the consulting producer. Erin Smith was the production manager and Michael McMurray was the director of photography, while Allan Lee and Anupam Nigam acted as the season's script editors. David Crabtree, James Ilecic, Allan Lee, and Gordon Rempel were the script editors. Music for the first season was written and composed by Adam Cohen, John Wood, and Brandon Christie.

Michael Engler directed the pilot episode, which was written by Steve Franks. The following three episodes were developed by Franks, who returned to write the season's tenth episode, "From the Earth to the Starbucks", as well as co-authoring the season finale with James Roday. Andy Berman, who would often present scripts which were a few dozen pages too long, wrote the third, eleventh, and twelfth episodes for the season. Executive producers Kerry Lenhart and John J. Sakmar collaborated to write the seventh and fourteenth episodes, with assistance from Douglas Steinberg on the latter. Script editor Anupam Nigam also wrote two episodes. William Rabkin, who would later write a series of novels for the series, collaborated with Lee Goldberg to write the ninth episode.

Executive producer Mel Damski, who had been nominated for the Emmy Award for Outstanding Directing in a Drama for his work on the series Lou Grant, directed the second and ninth episodes of the season. Michael Zinberg, who was working as a director on Monk, was the only other person who directed more than a single episode; he directed two, the third and tenth episodes. The people who directed a single episode were Grey's Anatomy director Jeff Melman, It's Always Sunny in Philadelphia producer Matt Shakman, occasional Rescue Me director John Fortenberry, frequent Dawson's Creek director Michael Lange, frequent Veronica Mars director John T. Kretchmer, Tim Matheson, who played John Hoynes on The West Wing, infrequent Weeds director Lev L. Spiro, long-time Charmed executive producer and director James L. Conway, Growing Pains actress and experienced director Joanna Kerns,  and movie writer, director, and actor John Landis.

Casting

Two actors received star billing for the first season, while three additional actors were considered part of the main cast. James Roday portrayed Shawn Spencer, a life-long slacker who uses his hyperobservant ability to claim he is a psychic. Dulé Hill plays Burton "Gus" Guster, a pharmaceutical salesman who is Shawn's best friend. Timothy Omundson portrays detective Carlton Lassiter, the level-headed lead detective for the Santa Barbara Police Department, and Maggie Lawson represents Juliet O'Hara, the department's naive junior detective. Shawn's father, Henry Spencer, a former police officer, is played by Corbin Bernsen and Karen Vick, the pregnant interim police chief is portrayed by Kirsten Nelson. By August 30, James Roday and Dulé Hill had been cast to play the show's main characters. The network also revealed that Corbin Bernsen had been cast as another of the show's major characters. On April 27, USA Network announced that Timothy Omundson and Kirsten Nelson would have starring roles in the episode.

Writing
 
All fifteen episodes of Psych'''s first season were written with a stand-alone plot, meaning that no episode built off of a previous one. However, the installments were noted that even though they were stand-alone, episodes often built on each other for character development and would occasionally reference each other, creating a feel of continuity. To save production time, nearly all the pilot episode was adapted from the original pitch to USA Network; the pitch focused on a man who would call in tips to the police department until he finally got mixed up in a situation with the police. The rest of the writing for the episode was added late in pre-production. Corbin Bernsen requested and was granted the addition of two scenes in the installment. Both involved his character confronting Shawn. The episode included multiple flashbacks, which in subsequent episodes were used as an opening scene. In the pilot, flashbacks were also included in the middle of the episode. The majority of alteration to the script occurred with the arrest of the episode's antagonist, a scene which the writers felt was never perfectly right.

While in early development for the series, Franks and the show's writing team consulted several outside sources to help make the show seem more realistic. Franks regularly consulted with his family, especially his father, when writing the police-related aspects of the show. Some scenes from episodes were actually taken directly from the teachings of Franks' father. The opening scene for the pilot episode, where Henry Spencer asks Shawn how many hats are in the room, was a test that the elder Franks would challenge his son with. The show's writers and actors also met with actual psychics before writing and editing portions of episodes. James Roday met with two psychics before his performance in the pilot, and adjusted his performance to make it seem more realistic.

Filming

Franks wanted to set Psych in a city that reflected the show's personality; he knew that he did not want the show to be set in a big city atmosphere. While developing Psych, Franks visited Santa Barbara during his honeymoon. He felt that Santa Barbara was the perfect place to set the show, but that they would be unable to film the show there. Executive producer Mel Damski commented the filming of the show, that "We wanted to set and film it in Santa Barbara, but the area doesn’t really have enough crewmembers". After the show was approved, Franks began looking for places to film, settling for Vancouver, British Columbia. He felt that Vancouver was "the next best location" to Santa Barbara. Although he chose to film the show in Vancouver, most of the show is actually filmed in the surrounding communities. About half of each episode is filmed in the Vancouver suburb of White Rock, including most scenes focusing on coastal areas. Portions of the episodes are also filmed in the mountain ranges surrounding Vancouver, and occasionally in the Pacific Ocean around the city.

The episode "Pilot" was filmed entirely on location in and around Vancouver. Due to uncertainty about the show succeeding, producers decided to film the episode at actual locations in the community, instead of on a sound stage. The decision led to several issues while filming. On multiple occasions the film crew had to alter several scenes and repeatedly re-shoot a scene. For the episode's opening, the film crew had only a few feet of space to operate and maneuver the camera. The multiple scenes involving the police station were filmed in a former children's hospital and army barracks and a supposedly "haunted" former insane asylum. The decision to shoot outside also created multiple issues with weather. Filmed in November and December, the temperature while filming was usually between 1°C and 4 °C (33.8°F–39.2 °F). Rain also affected filming, forcing the crew to purchase and use multiple tarps and additional sound equipment.

 
Following the success of the pilot episode and the troubles of filming it, the entire rest of the season was filmed on several sound stages. Aside from an occasional scene in the mountains or city, the majority of each episode is filmed on one of several stages at North Shore Studios. Each episode is allotted a two-week window for filming. The first week is dedicated entirely to construct and alter the sets for that week's episode. In order to make the show seem more convincing, the set designers purchased and imported eight artificial palm trees, surf boards, and large quantities of both real and fake newspapers. Several of the props, including the palm trees, had to be moved between sets while filming. The second week is devoted entirely to filming, which often requires several takes for each scene. 

The majority of the sets for the show are located within two warehouses on the North Shore Studios property. The police station occupies nearly an entire warehouse, while assorted other sets, like the Psych office, take up the other one. Henry Spencer's house was originally filmed at actual houses, moving from the one used in the pilot to one closer to the ocean before filming the rest of the season. Most of the sets were constructed shortly after filming for the pilot episode concluded. However, the design team disliked how some of the sets turned out, so several were altered before filming for the next episodes began. Before the filming for "Spellingg Bee" began, the Psych office was significantly expanded, becoming the second largest stage for the show and the office for the police chief was rearranged and repainted to brighten it.

Although most episodes were filmed almost entirely on main stages and a few surrounding areas, a few installments required special sets and filming areas. Several parts of "Spellingg Bee" were filmed in a set designed to look like Santa Barbara's Arlington Theater, while other portions were filmed in a basement on the North Shore facility. For "9 Lives", the crew created a large, complex set for a fake suicide hotline company. A few scenes in the episode were filmed in a large apartment complex, portions of which they rented out for other episodes, like "Poker? I Barely Know Her". It was one of several episodes where the seven-day time restraint affected numerous shots. The majority of the episode "Weekend Warriors" was filmed outdoors, which led to many problems. The episode's filming was the most troublesome of any for the first season. Numerous logistical errors caused long delays and re-shoots for the installment. The episode nearly caused a delay in the entire show, but production on it was replaced by work on "9 Lives", and was continued after that episode was finished. It was one of several episodes which were filmed out of running order.

Music

The show's theme song, which functions as the main title music, was composed by the group The Friendly Indians. The song, titled "I Know, You Know" was written and performed by the band, which both Steve Franks and writer Tim Meltreger are members of, as the lead guitarist and vocalist, respectively. The group formed in 1991, and the song was their first original performance. The group went on hiatus due to the series, not performing from 2006 until 2010. A shortened portion of the song is actually used for the show. Other music for the show was composed by a team of musicians Adam Cohen, John Wood, and Brandon Christie. Music was generally used on the show sparingly, usually as a background during a scene. One of the few important instances of music was the short performance of a song called "Dazzle and Stretch". The song was an improvisation by Roday, which the crew loved. Just before the episode was given to the network, the music team composed and added an original piece to the scene. Most other instances of music were the playing of a radio, which was most apparent in "9 Lives".

Reception

Critical reception
Critical reception to Psychs first season has been generally positive. At the media review aggregator website Rotten Tomatoes the first season currently holds a 50% approval rating from critics, giving it an overall "rotten" rating. The score is based on reviews from twelve critics who gave the season an average rating of 4.9/10. Among the site's top critics, it holds a 38% approval rating with an average score of 5.4/10. The site's consensus states "Its premise is sure to draw comparisons to Monk, and Psych's lead character that is an acquired taste at best [sic]". At review aggregator Metacritic the season currently holds a rating of 58 (out of 100) from mainstream critics, indicating "mixed or average reviews". The rating is based on twenty critical opinions, consisting of nine positive, eight mixed, and three negative reviews.

Initial reception to the show was mixed. Linda Stasi, writing for the New York Post gave the show a highly positive review, saying that "it's not only laugh-out-loud-until-soda-squirts-out-of-your-nose funny, but it's also perfectly cast" and "'Psych' is just terrific". Writing for the Chicago Tribune, television critic Maureen Ryan presented a positive review of the show, stating that the writers "manage to send up the trend in their clever new 'psychic detective' show while also charming the socks off the viewer" and that "if you like Monk, you'll probably love this show, which may actually be even more enjoyable". Seattle Post-Intelligencer television critic Melanie McFarland gave the show a generally favorable review, calling it "one of those happy collisions of an intelligent script and an appealing cast" as well as "more than adequate, thankfully for us". In his review of the show for USA Today, critic Robert Bianco gave the pilot episode three out of four stars and called it "an auspicious debut" and stating that "[the show's] gimmick allows for some clever comic jibes while creating some useful dramatic tension". Presenting a more mixed review, Variety'''s Brian Lowry said that while "the 90-minute premiere does at least establish a premise with potential legs", "'Psych' isn’t nearly as much fun as it ought to be, offering a breezy but not particularly captivating twist on a very well-worn buddy formula". Amy Finnerty of The Wall Street Journal also presented a mixed opinion of the show, saying that "the premise is promising", but also that Shawn and Gus' relationship "is a tired formula, and the pair's supposedly spontaneous banter feels forced". Tom Gliatto of People magazine gave the show a highly negative review, stating that it's "not in the same league. Or astral plane" with Monk and that "it's also like watching someone test Christmas lights for faulty bulbs". He gave the series an overall rating of one-and-a-half stars.

The rest of the first season received very little mainstream critical attention. Reviews for the first few episodes were polarized; while one critic described several episodes as "unintentionally lackluster", "mildly boring", "a mediocre adventure in detective comedy television", and "drop[ping] in posthaste behind Monk", another critic used terms like "pretty unique", "will only get stronger from here", and containing "manic personality". As the season progressed, critics from both IGN and TV Squad agreed that the episode quality continuously improved. IGN's Colin Moriarty stated that "Weekend Warriors" was, when "taken at face-value, [...] both laugh-out-loud funny and more clever than we've given it credit for". Richard Keller of TV Squad praised the character development and acting quality of the same episode. The installment "Forget Me Not" was the first of the season to receive a rating of 9 out of 10 from IGN, which on their scale translates to "Amazing". Five of the following six episodes also received the same rating, with one episode given an 8.5 rating.

Several episodes from the first season have retrospectively considered some of the show's best. Four installments, "Pilot", "Spellingg Bee", "From the Earth to the Starbucks", and "Scary Sherry: Bianca's Toast", are part of two special DVD releases for the show. The first, titled Psych: Twelve Episodes That Will Make You Happy consisted of Steve Franks' favorite episodes. The second was made up of James Roday and Dulé Hill's favorite episodes, and is titled Psych: James and Dule's Top 20. Writing for The Macomb Daily, editor Amanda Lee named "Scary Sherry: Bianca's Toast", "Shawn vs. the Red Phantom", and "Spellingg Bee" to her list of the show's best installments, and gave "9 Lives" an honorable mention.

AccoladesPsychs first season received a total of five award nominations, winning one of them. Three of the nominations were for acting on the show. For his performance in portraying Burton "Gus" Guster in the episode "Spellingg Bee", Dulé Hill was nominated to win the award for "Best Actor–Comedy" at the 13th Annual NAMIC Vision Awards. The awards are organized by the National Association for Multi-ethnicity in Communications (NAMIC), and are given for "outstanding achievements in original, multi-ethnic cable programming". Other nominees for the award were Carlos Mencia, Romany Malco, and Damon Wayans. Hill lost the award to Mencia. The International Press Academy recognized James Roday's portrayal of Shawn Spencer by nominating him as the best actor in a comedy or musical series at the 11th Satellite Awards. Other nominees for the award were Steve Carell, James Spader, Ted Danson, Stephen Colbert, and Jason Lee. Spader received the award for his work. Calum Worthy, who appeared as a guest star in the episode "Shawn vs. The Red Phantom" and in the second season episode "If You're So Smart, Then Why Are You Dead", was nominated for Best Performance in a TV Series - Recurring Young Actor at the 29th Young Artist Awards. Presented by the Young Artist Association, the awards honor the best performances by young performers in television. Ten other actors were also nominated, with the award going to Connor Price for his work on The Dead Zone.

In addition to the award nominations for acting, the season also received two nominations for other purposes. The pilot episode received a nomination for Best Comedy Pilot Casting at the 2007 Artios Awards. The Artios Awards are annually presented by the Casting Society of America and recognize the "originality, creativity and the contribution of casting to the overall quality of a project". The awards honor members of the Casting Society, and have been awarded yearly since 1985. Casting for theatrical, film, and television performances are all eligible. Liz Marx was listed as the nominee for the casting; she did not receive the award. The season's only win came at the IIG Awards. The awards are presented yearly by the Independent Investigations Group and recognize "movies, television shows, and people in the entertainment field for promoting scientific knowledge and values". The awards were first presented in 2007, honoring the best and worst representations of science in the media. The show was honored with an Iggie Award at the inaugural ceremony, which was accepted by staff writer Daniel Hsia.

DVD release

The entire first season was officially released on DVD in Region 1 on June 26, 2007, becoming available in both the United States and Canada. The release came nearly a year after the pilot premiered. The box set is simply titled "Psych, the Complete First Season" and is marked with a green color scheme. The release set consists of episodes with Dolby Digital 5.1 surround sound and widescreen format, enhanced for television with a 16:9 aspect ratio, although not in high definition (HD). It received no rating from the MPAA. The set is distributed by NBCUniversal, USA Network's parent company. The same set was released in Region 4 on April 30, 2008, being made available first in Australia. It was first released in Region 2 on January 9, 2008, shortly before the start of season 3, with first availability being made in the United Kingdom. The entire season and each individual episode are available on the iTunes store.

The box set includes all fifteen original episodes that aired on USA Network, which are divided into four separate discs. Subtitles are available in English for people who have impaired hearing, and the only available language for episodes is English. The first disc only contains a single episode, the pilot; however, several special features are also on the disc. Both an audio commentary with Steve Franks, Kelly Kulchak, and Chris Henze and a blooper reel are available for the episode. Also included are character profiles, the extended international version of the pilot, James Roday's audition tape, and two behind-the-scenes featurettes, Psych Revealed and Inside the Writer's Room. The remainind discs have four or five episodes on each and contain a few special features. Included are audio commentaries for the episodes "Spellingg Bee", "9 Lives", "Weekend Warriors", "From the Earth to the Starbucks", and "Scary Sherry: Bianca's Toast" with Franks, Kulchak, and occasionally Dulé Hill, James Roday, Henze, or the episode's respective writer. Deleted scenes are also included for the majority of episodes. The box set's materials combine for a total of eleven hours and nine minutes of footage.

Currently ranked as number 4,713 in the Movies and Television category on Amazon.com and number 8,287 in the DVD and Blu-ray category at Amazon.co.uk, the DVD release has received generally positive reviews from television critics. Scott Harris of UGO.com gave the box set a positive review, stating that the show translated "pretty well" to DVD. He praised the ability to "sit down and view an episode here or there whenever you want without making a giant production out of it". Harris also liked the set's special features, stating that they allowed viewers to "[turn] each episode into a giant production" and praised the inclusion of the special features on the discs alongside their respective episodes, instead of placing them on another disc. He summed up his review by stating that "it's a pretty neat little package when taken on an episode-by-episode basis" and that fans of the show would enjoy the release. Harris rated three aspects of the release; he gave the look a B−, the sound a B, and the extras an A−. 

In his review for MovieFreak.com, critic Richard Scott presented a mixed-to-generally positive review of the set. Scott was positive about the audio and video, but presented a mixed view towards the extras. He enjoyed the commentaries, saying that they are "more chatty than informative, but everyone is relaxed, and the result is entertaining and fun", but was not favorable about the international pilot. Scott was generally mixed towards the deleted scenes and character profiles, but liked the blooper reel and called it "better than most". He gave the video and audio an eight of ten, and the extras a seven. Scott presented an overall rating of "Recommended" to the release. Reviewing the show and release for WF DVD Report, Zach Demeter presented a generally positive review. He praised the set's audio and video, calling them "absolutely awesome" and being better than the show's original broadcast. He stated that the set has "cool packaging" but that it is "just a bit on the strange side". Demeter also praised the set's special features, but was disappointed by the short length of the blooper reel and other things like the full screen release of the features. He liked the commentaries and deleted scenes, but was mixed in his opinion on the international pilot. Overall, Demeter stated that it "comes with a high level of re-play value even after already knowing how the stories end" and gave the box set a rating of "Highly Recommended".

Notes

References

Psych
2006 American television seasons
2007 American television seasons